Leach  may refer to:

 Leach (surname)
 Leach, Oklahoma, an unincorporated community, United States
 Leach, Tennessee, an unincorporated community, United States
 Leach Highway, Western Australia
 Leach orchid
 Leach phenotype, a mutation in the gene encoding Glycophorin C
 Low Energy Adaptive Clustering Hierarchy (LEACH), a routing protocol in wireless sensor networks
 "Leach", a song by Cryptopsy off their album The Unspoken King
 River Leach, England, United Kingdom
 Leach Range, a mountain range in Elko County, Nevada
 Leach (food), jelly-like sweetmeat popular in the 1600s

See also
 Leach field, or septic drain field
 Leaching (disambiguation)
 Leech (disambiguation)